Khor al-Beida is a tidal wetland in the Emirate of Umm al Quwain.  It hosts several species of crabs, mollusks and wintering shorebirds. The fragile ecosystem is under threat from illegal felling of Mangroves and real estate development.

Birdlife International and The UAE Ministry of Climate Change & Environment have listed Khor al Beidah as an Important Bird Area (IBA).

More than 420 different species have been recorded in this region and the region is largely left unprotected

Bird species 

 Western Reef Heron 
 Kentish Plover
 Lesser Sand Plover
 Greater Sand Plover 
 Great Knot
 Crab-plover
 More in this checklist

References 

Environment of the United Arab Emirates
Important Bird Areas of the United Arab Emirates